Anne Fraser Bon (9 April 1838 – 5 June 1936) was a Scottish-born Australian pastoralist, philanthropist and advocate for Aboriginal people.

She was born in Perthshire, Scotland and was the second daughter of physician David Dougall. In 1858, she married John Bon, and moved to Victoria where Bon had established himself.

She was active in advocating for marginalised persons in Victoria, including the Chinese, blind soldiers and inmates of State mental institutions. She campaigned for a public inquiry into the treatment of Victoria's Aboriginal people, which led to the 1881 Coranderrk Inquiry to which she was an appointed member. Bon was later appointed to Victoria's Aboriginal Protection Board. In 1934 she presented the stone used for the monument in Healesville to William Barak, with whom she had a long association.

Bon died on 5 June 1936 in Melbourne.

References

1838 births
1936 deaths
Scottish emigrants to Australia
Australian pastoralists
Australian women farmers
19th-century Australian philanthropists
Australian women philanthropists
20th-century Australian philanthropists